Wade Hampton is a census-designated place (CDP) in Greenville County, South Carolina, United States. The population was 20,622 at the 2010 census. It is named for American Civil War general and South Carolina governor Wade Hampton.

Wade Hampton is part of the Greenville–Mauldin–Easley Metropolitan Statistical Area.

Geography
Wade Hampton is located in central Greenville County at  (34.883084, -82.333227). It is bordered to the southwest by the city of Greenville and to the northeast by Taylors, an unincorporated community. U.S. Route 29 (Wade Hampton Boulevard) passes through the CDP, leading southwest  to the center of Greenville and northeast  to Greer.

Demographics

2020 census

As of the 2020 United States census, there were 21,482 people, 9,016 households, and 5,368 families residing in the CDP.

2000 census
As of the census of 2000, there were 20,458 people, 9,210 households, and 5,645 families residing in the CDP. The population density was 2,331.4 people per square mile (900.7/km2). There were 9,793 housing units at an average density of 1,116.0 per square mile (431.1/km2). The racial makeup of the CDP was 84.85% White, 8.08% African American, 0.18% Native American, 3.34% Asian, 0.06% Pacific Islander, 2.39% from other races, and 1.11% from two or more races. Hispanic or Latino of any race were 6.13% of the population.

There were 9,210 households, out of which 22.9% had children under the age of 18 living with them, 49.4% were married couples living together, 9.0% had a female householder with no husband present, and 38.7% were non-families. 32.7% of all households were made up of individuals, and 10.8% had someone living alone who was 65 years of age or older. The average household size was 2.21 and the average family size was 2.81.

In the CDP, the population was spread out, with 19.0% under the age of 18, 9.6% from 18 to 24, 28.9% from 25 to 44, 24.3% from 45 to 64, and 18.2% who were 65 years of age or older. The median age was 40 years. For every 100 females, there were 93.8 males. For every 100 females age 18 and over, there were 90.9 males.

The median income for a household in the CDP was $40,487, and the median income for a family was $54,106. Males had a median income of $40,528 versus $27,613 for females. The per capita income for the CDP was $26,376. About 6.4% of families and 9.0% of the population were below the poverty line, including 10.9% of those under age 18 and 5.3% of those age 65 or over.

Education 

The French Bilingual School of South Carolina is located in Wade Hampton.

The Greenville Saturday School (グリーンビル日本語補習授業校 Gurīnbiru Nihongo Hoshū Jugyō Kō), a Japanese Saturday supplementary school, holds its classes at the French Bilingual School. The school was scheduled to open in 1989. The school received $2,500 from the city council of Greenville.

References

Census-designated places in Greenville County, South Carolina
Census-designated places in South Carolina
Upstate South Carolina